Conostomum tetragonum, or helmet-moss, is a species of bryophyte found in Europe.

Shoots grow to a maximum height of 2 cm. Leaves are shaped like narrow spearheads and sharply pointed. Capsules are nearly spherical and 2mm long.

It thrives in acidic, rocky mountain soils, especially where there is snow cover for a large part of the year, and on summit ridges. It grows in continental Europe and in Scotland. This species became extinct in England in the 1950s.

References

Bartramiales
Flora of Europe